Maurício Gugelmin (born 20 April 1963) is a Brazilian former racing driver. He took part in both Formula One and Championship Auto Racing Teams (CART). Gugelmin achieved one top-three finish and scored a total of ten championship points in the series. He competed in CART between 1993 and 2001, starting 147 races. Gugelmin won one race, in 1997 in Vancouver, finishing fourth in the championship that year. His best result in the Indianapolis 500 was in 1995 where he started and finished in sixth position, leading 59 laps. Gugelmin retired at the end of 2001 after a year that included the death of his third child.

Personal and early life 

Gugelmin was born to a wealthy family in Joinville, Brazil on 20 April 1963. His father is a timber merchant and a collector of antique cars. Gugelmin is married to Stella Maris, and they have two sons, Bernardo and Gabriel. Their third son, Giuliano, who was Bernardo's twin, died from cerebral palsy in April 2001 at the age of six.

Career

Before Formula One 

Gugelmin started racing go-karts as a child in Brazil in 1971, winning his local championship nine years in a row from 1971 to 1979. He progressed to the Brazilian national championship in 1980, which he also won. He progressed to single-seater racing cars in 1981, when he won the Brazilian Formula Fiat Championship.

In 1982 Gugelmin, like many Brazilian drivers of his generation, moved to the United Kingdom to further his racing career. He was a longtime friend of future Formula One world champion Ayrton Senna, who was already racing in the country, and the two shared a house from 1982 to 1987. Senna, having previously been a Formula Ford driver with the Van Diemen team, used his influence within the organisation to secure Gugelmin a race seat with them for 1982. By the end of the year, Gugelmin was the British Formula Ford 1600 cc champion with 13 race wins and 90 points scored. He followed this up by finishing as runner-up in the British Formula Ford 2000 cc series the following year. He moved to the European Formula Ford series in 1984, and won the title at his first attempt. A progression to Formula Three followed in 1985 with West Surrey Racing, winning the British championship and the season-ending Macau Grand Prix. Gugelmin subsequently spent two years in International Formula 3000 (F3000), the final step before Formula One, competing with sponsorship backing for the 1986 season. He took one victory in F3000, at Silverstone in 1987 while driving for the Ralt factory team.

Formula One 
	

Gugelmin entered Formula One, the highest category of circuit racing defined by the Fédération Internationale de l'Automobile (FIA), motorsport's world governing body, with the March team in the 1988 season, as team-mate to Ivan Capelli. He had previously been in contention for a drive with Lotus in the 1986 championship at the request of his friend Ayrton Senna, however the British team could not promote two Brazilian drivers and he was overlooked in favour of Johnny Dumfries. He finished the season as the highest-scoring newcomer in the Formula One World Championship, ending the year in 13th position overall.

He finished in third position; an excellent result given that March were financially troubled. A photograph of the accident was later selected for a London Exhibition as one of Formula One's most striking photographs. The race was stopped as a result; Gugelmin took the restart from the pit lane and set the race's fastest lap, the only one of his F1 career.

In  the March team was sold, and became known as Leyton House. Running the whole race without changing their tyres, Capelli and Gugelmin ran first and second during the race. Gugelmin retired from fourth position mid-race with engine problems but he went on to score a single point for finishing  in sixth place in the  later in the season.

The 1991 championship saw internal turmoil at the team with several key staff leaving. The car lacked pace and both Gugelmin and Capelli struggled; the team scored just one point all season. Gugelmin's best result amounted to three seventh-place finishes, although he retired from eight of the season's sixteen races. In September, the team's principal, Akira Akagi, was arrested on suspicion of fraud. Money was tight, and Gugelmin made the decision to leave the team at the end of the year. A switch to the Jordan team for the 1992 season did not improve Gugelmin's fortunes. The team struggled with financial difficulties and scored only one point all year. The team's Yamaha engine was underpowered, and the car was unreliable. Gugelmin failed to finish eleven out of the sixteen races, and scored no points.

Champ Car 

Gugelmin signed with Dick Simon Racing to take part in the North American Championship Auto Racing Teams (CART) racing series for the last three races of 1993. Although races at Mid Ohio and Nazareth resulted in non-finishes, Gugelmin finished 13th at Laguna Seca although this was not high enough to receive any points. Despite this, Gugelmin demonstrated promise. In the 1994 season, Gugelmin signed with Chip Ganassi Racing to partner Michael Andretti who returned to the series after a season in Formula One. Andretti was more successful than Gugelmin, and took two wins, including Reynard's first win in Champ Car at Surfers Paradise. Gugelmin was hindered by a lack of cooperation between his and Andretti's crews, and his first full-time year in the Champ Car World Series resulted in seven points finishes and 16th in the points standings.

The 1995 season commenced with Gugelmin finishing in second place to Jacques Villeneuve in the first round of the year at Miami. He went on to finish in sixth position at the Indianapolis 500 after leading the most laps of any driver. Eight additional points finishes, including a third place at the final round at Laguna Seca, meant he finished tenth in the final drivers' points standings, nine positions ahead of his experienced teammate and former series champion Danny Sullivan.

For the 1996 championship, Gugelmin was partnered at PacWest by the British driver Mark Blundell. He established a reputation for being quick at superspeedway tracks after taking a second and a third place at the two events at Michigan International Speedway. On top of this he took four other points finishes, finishing the season in 14th place. For the 1997 season, Gugelmin had lost  under a fitness programme, and the PacWest team switched to using Firestone tyres and Mercedes-Benz engines. The package was competitive throughout the year and Gugelmin and Blundell finished fourth and sixth in the championship respectively. Gugelmin's notable races of the year include the Detroit Indy Grand Prix, where Gugelmin was leading the race on the last lap when he ran out of fuel, and the Molson Indy Vancouver, where Gugelmin won his first Champ Car race. One of the most popular men in the championship, virtually the entire pit-lane was full of happiness for him. Gugelmin went on to finish the race in fourth place.

The 1998 championship proved not to be as successful. Setbacks plagued the team and they struggled to get to grips with the new chassis. Gugelmin showed determination, and scored nine points-scoring finishes. A highlight was Gugelmin leading 40 laps during the final event at California Speedway, en route to finishing in fifth place. Gugelmin was unable to reproduce his race-winning form, and finished no higher than 15th position in the final points standings over the next three years. In the 2000 season, Gugelmin was named as the chairman of the Championship Drivers Association, the organisation set up to represent the interests of the drivers in the CART drivers. That year, his best finish was a second place at Nazareth Speedway and was 17th in the points standings.

The 2001 season saw PacWest switch engine manufacturers from Mercedes to Toyota and Gugelmin would be partnered by Indy Lights champion Scott Dixon. During the practice session for the race at Texas Motor Speedway, Gugelmin crashed after he lost control in the second turn and hit the wall with the acceleration peaked at 66.2 g, before a second impact with the wall where acceleration peaked at 113.1 g. The event was eventually cancelled after drivers complained of dizziness, nausea and blurred vision, which were caused by the high g-forces experienced when driving at speed on the track. During the week before the race at Nazareth Speedway, Gugelmin's son, Giuliano, died from respiratory complications. Giuliano was quadriplegic and a lifelong sufferer from cerebral palsy owing to complications at birth. As a result, he did not take part in the race after PacWest Racing withdrew his entry as a mark of respect. He qualified on pole position for the Grand Prix of Cleveland later in the season. At the end of 2001, Gugelmin decided to retire from the sport, stating "I definitely want to spend more time with my family. After those two big accidents, and Alex [Zanardi]'s deal in Germany, I said, 'That's it. Forget it.' "

After Champ Car 
In 2003 Gugelmin was announced as a competitor by the organizers of the new Renault Megane Super Cup in his native Brazil. However, the series did not launch and since then Gugelmin has made no competitive appearances in motorsport. Following his retirement, Gugelmin put his Florida mansion in Coral Gables up for sale for $17 million, and moved back to live in Brazil full-time. He runs the family business along with his brother, Alceu, and has also done consultancy work for Mercedes-Benz subsidiary AMG. Both his surviving sons compete in go-kart events.

Racing record

Career summary

Complete British Formula Three results
(key) (Races in bold indicate pole position; races in italics indicate fastest lap; small number denotes finishing position.)

Complete Macau Grand Prix results

Complete International Formula 3000 results
(key) (Races in bold indicate pole position; races in italics indicate fastest lap; small number denotes finishing position.)

Complete Formula One results 
(key) (Races in bold indicate pole position, races in italics indicate fastest lap; small number indicates finishing position)

American open-wheel racing results 
(key) (Races in bold indicate pole position; small number denotes finishing position)

CART

Indianapolis 500

References

External links 
 Maurício Gugelmin's Official Website (Portuguese)

Living people
1963 births
Brazilian racing drivers
Brazilian Formula One drivers
March Formula One drivers
Leyton House Formula One drivers
Jordan Formula One drivers
Brazilian people of Italian descent
Indianapolis 500 drivers
Brazilian Champ Car drivers
British Formula Three Championship drivers
International Formula 3000 drivers
People from Joinville
Sportspeople from Coral Gables, Florida
Chip Ganassi Racing drivers
Sportspeople from Santa Catarina (state)
PacWest Racing drivers